This is a list of members of the Australian Senate from 1917 to 1920. Half of its members were elected at the 5 September 1914 election and had terms notionally starting on 1 July 1914 and finishing on 30 June 1920; the other half were elected at the 5 May 1917 election and had terms starting on 1 July 1917 and finishing on 30 June 1923.

Notes

References

Members of Australian parliaments by term
20th-century Australian politicians
Australian Senate lists